The 1952 United States presidential election in Illinois took place on November 4, 1952, as part of the 1952 United States presidential election. State voters chose 27 representatives, or electors, to the Electoral College, who voted for president and vice president.

Illinois was won by Columbia University President Dwight D. Eisenhower (R–Kansas), running with Senator Richard Nixon, with 54.84% of the popular vote, against Adlai Stevenson (D–Illinois), running with Senator John Sparkman, with 44.94% of the popular vote. Despite Stevenson’s popularity as Governor of his home state, he would lose Illinois twice by double digits and even lose his home county (Cook) – which no Democrat since except George McGovern in 1972 has lost. Nonetheless, Illinois’ result was still 1% more Democratic than the nation-at-large. 

Eisenhower was the first Republican presidential candidate ever to carry Dixie-leaning Union County, which alongside his triumphs in Indiana’s Brown County and Dubois County meant that every antebellum free state county had as of 1952 voted for a Republican presidential candidate at least once.

Election information
The primaries and general elections coincided with those for congress and those for state offices.

Turnout
The total vote in the state-run primary elections (Democratic and Republican) was 1,872,435.

Turnout during the general election was 84.49%, with 4,481,058 votes cast.

Primaries
Both major parties held non-binding state-run preferential primaries on April 8.

Democratic

The 1952 Illinois Democratic presidential primary was held on April 8, 1952 in the U.S. state of Illinois as one of the Democratic Party's state primaries ahead of the 1952 presidential election.

The popular vote was a non-binding "beauty contest". Delegates were instead elected by direct votes by congressional district on delegate candidates.

Estes Kefauver, the only declared candidate included in the Illinois primary, won in a landslide.

Incumbent president Harry S. Truman had already declared he would not be seeking reelection.

Adlai Stevenson II, the Governor of Illinois, was not a declared candidate at the time of the primary, and was, in fact, on the same day, running for renomination as Governor of Illinois. He would only become a candidate after being drafted at the Democratic National Convention. Nonetheless, he placed second in the Illinois primary.

Republican

The 1952 Illinois Republican presidential primary was held on April 8, 1952 in the U.S. state of Illinois as one of the Republican Party's state primaries ahead of the 1952 presidential election.

The preference vote was a "beauty contest". Delegates were instead selected by direct-vote in each congressional districts on delegate candidates.

General election

Results by county

See also
 1952 Illinois elections
 United States presidential elections in Illinois

Notes

References

 

Illinois
1952
1952 Illinois elections